Rebecca Cooke (born 24 June 1983) was a British swimmer.

Swimming career
Cooke represented Great Britain in the Olympics, FINA world championships and European championships, and England in the Commonwealth Games.  She competed internationally in freestyle and individual medley swimming events. She has won medals at every major international championships with the exception of the Olympic Games. She won the ASA National Championship 800 metres freestyle title for six consecutive years from 2000 until 2005.

She retired from international competition in April 2008 after failing to make the British team for the 2008 Games in Beijing.

See also
 List of World Aquatics Championships medalists in swimming (women)
 List of Commonwealth Games medallists in swimming (women)

References

1983 births
Living people
Commonwealth Games gold medallists for England
Commonwealth Games silver medallists for England
English female swimmers
European Aquatics Championships medalists in swimming
Medalists at the FINA World Swimming Championships (25 m)
Olympic swimmers of Great Britain
Swimmers at the 2000 Summer Olympics
Swimmers at the 2002 Commonwealth Games
Swimmers at the 2004 Summer Olympics
Swimmers at the 2006 Commonwealth Games
World Aquatics Championships medalists in swimming
Commonwealth Games medallists in swimming
Universiade medalists in swimming
Universiade gold medalists for Great Britain
Universiade silver medalists for Great Britain
Universiade bronze medalists for Great Britain
Medalists at the 2003 Summer Universiade
Medalists at the 2005 Summer Universiade
Medallists at the 2002 Commonwealth Games
Medallists at the 2006 Commonwealth Games